Gladwell Jesire Cheruiyot is a kenyan politician and a current Member of Kenyan Africa National Union party (KANU) since 2017. She is the current Women Representative for Baringo County

Education 
She attended the Kisan Primary School where she obtained Kenya Certificate of Primary Education KCPE from 1982-1989. She obtained her Kenya Certificate of Secondary Education KCSE in Kituro Secondary School from1990 to 1993. Between 1995 to 1998 She obtained obtained a Diploma in Pharmacy in Kenya Medical Training College (KMTC)b. She also attended Kisii University where she obtained a Bachelor of Arts in Criminology

Political career 
Gladwell Jesire  served at the Kenya Ministry of Health from 2003 to 2017 as Senior Pharmacy Technician. She was elected in the Kenyan National Assembly as the Baringo County Member of Parliament Since 2017 till date. She is a member of the Departmental Committee on Health and a member of the Parliamentary Powers and Privileges Committee. She supports Girls running away from Female genital Mutilations, distributing Sanitary pads and  empowering the girls to grow into productive individuals, she also trains women and people living with disabilities to lead normal lives. She advocates for the interests of women in by ensuring that the needs of women and girls as a special interest group are addressed as the National Assembly transacts its business as the Women Representative.

References 

Kenyan women
People from Baringo County
Kenya African National Union politicians
Living people
Kenyan politicians
21st-century Kenyan women politicians
21st-century Kenyan politicians
Kenyan women representatives
Members of the 13th Parliament of Kenya